The La Mesa Motel was a historic motel on Central Avenue (former U.S. Route 66) in Albuquerque, New Mexico, which was notable as one of the best-preserved prewar Route 66 motels remaining in the city. It was built in 1938 and was added to the New Mexico State Register of Cultural Properties and the National Register of Historic Places in 1993. The building was demolished in March, 2003, and replaced with a larger two-story motel.

The motel was a linear, one-story building with 14 rooms. All of the rooms except the northernmost unit faced east toward the parking lot, while the final unit extended east from the main block and faced south. The design featured modest Pueblo Revival elements, including vigas, slightly curved parapets, small porches supported by corbeled wooden posts, and a battered chimney. The office and manager's residence were at the front of the building; the office was probably a later addition.

See also

References

Hotels in Albuquerque, New Mexico
Hotel buildings on the National Register of Historic Places in New Mexico
New Mexico State Register of Cultural Properties
National Register of Historic Places in Albuquerque, New Mexico
Hotel buildings completed in 1938
Motels in the United States
U.S. Route 66 in New Mexico
Demolished hotels in the United States
Buildings and structures demolished in 2003
Demolished buildings and structures in New Mexico